Lethal injection is the practice of injecting one or more drugs into a person by a government for the express purpose of causing immediate death. While Nazi Germany was known to execute enemies of the state using an injection of lethal drugs, the first country to legalize and formally implement what is referred to today as lethal injection was the United States. The state of Texas adopted it as its form on capital punishment in 1977 and executed the first person by it, Charles Brooks Jr., in 1982. The practice was subsequently adopted by the other U.S. states using capital punishment. As of 2017, the method is being used by 31 U.S. states, as well as by their federal government and military.

Lethal injection was also adopted as a method of execution by Guatemala in 1996, China in 1997, the Philippines in 1999, Thailand in 2003, Taiwan in 2005, Vietnam in 2013, the Maldives in 2014 and Nigeria in 2015. The Philippines abolished the death penalty in 2006. While the death penalty still exists in the Maldives and Guatemala, no executions have been carried out there since 1954 and 2000 respectively. Taiwan has never actually used the method, instead carrying out all executions by single gunshot.

The United States and China are the two biggest users of this method of execution. The U.S. had executed 1,283 people via lethal injection as of April 2017. The number of people executed annually in China is thought to surpass all other countries combined, though the actual number is a state secret, and the percentage of people killed via lethal injection and the other method of execution used there, firing squad, is also unclear. This alphabetical list features notable cases up to March 2023, and only those where lethal injection can be reliably sourced to be the method of execution. The criterion for notability is either an article on the individual, or the crime they were executed for, in the English Wikipedia. This inevitably causes a bias towards U.S. executions, as notable individuals in other countries such as Thailand and Vietnam may only have articles in their own language. A complete list of all executions in the United States can be found here.

Lethal injection was proposed and adopted on the grounds it was more humane than the methods of execution in place at the time, such as the electric chair and gas chamber. Opponents of lethal injection reject this argument, noting multiple cases where executions have been either painful, prolonged, or both. According to the Death Penalty Information Center, lethal injections have the highest rate of botched executions of any method used in the US, with 7.12% of executions using this method between 1982 and 2010 considered to have not gone according to plan. A study published in The Lancet in 2005 found that in 43% of cases of lethal injection, the blood level of hypnotics was insufficient to guarantee unconsciousness. However, the Supreme Court of the United States ruled 7–2 in 2008 (Baze v. Rees) and 5–4 in 2015 (Glossip v. Gross) that lethal injection does not constitute cruel and unusual punishment.

Executions

See also
 Capital punishment in China
 Capital punishment in the United States
 Lists of people by cause of death
 List of deaths from drug overdose and intoxication
 List of deaths from legal euthanasia and assisted suicide

References

People executed by lethal injection
Lethal injection
Lists of people by cause of death